The 1948–49 season was the 34th in the history of the Isthmian League, an English football competition.

Dulwich Hamlet were champions, winning their fourth Isthmian League title.

League table

References

Isthmian League seasons
I